Hexalectris warnockii, the Texas crested coralroot, Texas purple-spike, is a myco-heterotrophic orchid found in the states of Texas and Arizona in the southwestern United States, and in the states of Coahuila and Baja California Sur in northern Mexico. Being myco-heterotrophic, H. warnockii derives all of its nutrients from mycorrhizal fungi.

References

External links
 
 

Bletiinae
Myco-heterotrophic orchids